The Chiclayo Metropolitan Area is the name used to refer to the metropolitan area whose principal city is Chiclayo, according to Municipality of Chiclayo. According to population statistics of INEI It is the fourth most populous metropolitan area of Peru in year 2015.

Population

According to studies of municipality of Chiclayo the population of Chiclayo metropolitan in the year 2017 was of 697.871 people distributed in its metropolitan districts.

Graphics of evolution of the population 
In the following Graphics the evolution of the population of Chiclayo metropolitan area.

See also 
 Chiclayo Province
 List of metropolitan areas of Peru
 Peru

References

Metropolitan areas of Peru
Chiclayo